The Belgian Fawn goat breed, created in Belgium, is descended from the Chamois Colored goat of Switzerland.  As such, it is related to and similar to the Oberhasli goat bred in the United States.

Sources
Belgian Fawn

Goat breeds
Dairy goat breeds
Goat breeds originating in Belgium